Var was a corvette of the French Navy, launched in 1806 as the name-ship of her class of flutes. She served as a storeship until the British captured her in 1809. She became the transport HMS Chichester, and was wrecked in 1811.

Career
Var was built to a design of Pierre-Alexandre Forfait, though Jacques-Noël Sanė modified it.

On the morning of 14 February 1809, under the  command of Captain James Brisbane, was about 12 leagues north of Corfu when she sighted a suspicious sail. Belle Poule gave chase and caught up with Var the next morning, finding her anchored under the guns of the fortresses guarding Valona. The fortresses did not come to Vars assistance, so after a few broadsides from Belle Poule, Var struck. Var was under the command of capitaine de frégate Paulin, who was sailing her from Corfu to Brindisi. The British suffered no casualties; Brisbane could not assess French casualties as most of Vars officers and men escaped ashore after she struck. (A French court martial on 16 April 1814 acquitted Paulin for the loss of his ship.)

Var was sent to Woolwich for fitting as a storeship, which took from 21 January to 23 March 1810. She was brought into British service as HMS Chichester.

Loss
On 2 May 1811, as she sailed under Master William Kirby, she was wrecked on the Madras roadstead with the loss of two crew. The violent gale also claimed the frigate Dover, several merchant vessels, and some 70 small craft.

Citations and references
Citations

References
 
  
 

Age of Sail corvettes of France
Shipwrecks in the Bay of Bengal
Shipwrecks of India
1806 ships
Maritime incidents in 1811
Ships built in France
Captured ships
Ships of the Royal Navy